The USSR national handball team was the national handball team of the Soviet Union.

World Championships Record

Summer Olympics Record

Player statistics

Most appearances
100+

Top scorers
250+

National teams of the former Soviet republics

See also
Soviet Union women's national handball team
Russia men's national handball team
Russia women's national handball team

External links

Former national handball teams
National sports teams of the Soviet Union